Erlend Engelsvoll (born 17 November 1975) is a Norwegian former professional racing cyclist. He won the Norwegian National Road Race Championship in 2001.

References

External links

1975 births
Living people
Norwegian male cyclists
Place of birth missing (living people)